The Albino Squirrel Preservation Society (ASPS) is an international collegiate organization dedicated to "fostering compassion and goodwill" toward albino squirrels. The ASPS has approximately 700 members in eight chapters across the United States, Canada and England.

Founded in April 2001 at the University of Texas at Austin, the first ASPS chapter was created to celebrate a longstanding legend on campus, which states that seeing an albino squirrel before a test is good luck. In reality none of the white squirrels on campus were technically albino and are instead typical fox squirrels with lighter coats. In less than a year, the UT Austin chapter became one of the largest official student organizations in the University's history.

After widespread popularity at UT Austin, the society's second and third chapters formed at the University of North Texas and University of Pennsylvania, respectively. In the following years, ASPS chapters were formed at the University of Western Ontario, Cambridge University, Texas A&M University, Illinois State University, the Juilliard School of Music, the University of Louisville, and Concord High School in Concord, California.

The ASPS has gained nationwide popularity through a number of media appearances, most notably with the University of North Texas chapter's appearance on Animal Planet. Club activities include pro-squirrel rallies, campouts, and t-shirt sales.

References

External links
 

Animal conservation organizations
Organizations established in 2001
Albinism
Squirrels in popular culture